Next Time I Marry is a 1938 American comedy film directed by Garson Kanin and written by John Twist and Helen Meinardi. The film stars Lucille Ball, James Ellison, Lee Bowman, Granville Bates and Mantan Moreland. The film was released on December 9, 1938, by RKO Pictures.

Plot
In this screwy romantic comedy, a young woman (Lucille Ball) stands to inherit $20 million provided she marries an American citizen. Unfortunately, she is in love with a handsome foreigner. To get the money, she marries the first Yankee she runs across—with every intention of obtaining a quickie divorce in Reno as soon as the money comes through. The bickersome newlyweds take a trailer and set off across the country to Reno, but through a series of zany mishaps and adventures they realize that they are slowly falling in love.

Cast 
Lucille Ball as Nancy Crocker Fleming
James Ellison as Anthony J. Anthony
Lee Bowman as Count Georgi
Granville Bates as	H.E. Crocker
Mantan Moreland as Tilby
Elliott Sullivan as Red
Murray Alper as Joe
 Ann Evers as Neeny

References

External links 
 

1938 films
American black-and-white films
1930s English-language films
RKO Pictures films
Films directed by Garson Kanin
Films produced by Cliff Reid
American comedy films
1938 comedy films
1930s American films